Luísa Clara de Portugal (known as "a Flor da Murta" (Flower of myrtle); 1702–1779) was a Portuguese courtier. She was the royal mistress of King John V of Portugal, with whom she also had a child, Maria Rita Gertrudes de Portugal. Two novels have been written about her.

References

1702 births
1779 deaths
18th-century Portuguese people
Mistresses of Portuguese royalty